Christophe Szpajdel (born 29 September 1970) is a Belgian-born international calligraphist and illustrator, principally known for designing band logos.

Life 
Szpajdel was born on 29 September 1970 in Gembloux, Namur, Belgium, and grew up in Louvain-la-Neuve, Walloon Brabant, Belgium. His parents are of Polish origin but immigrated to Belgium before he was born. He grew up speaking Polish and French, and eventually learned English, German, Dutch, Italian, Portuguese and Spanish. Szpajdel began drawing at the age of 3 when he drew a praying mantis while vacationing with his parents in the south of France.

From 1981 to 1989, he attended the Institut Saint-Jean Baptiste, a Catholic primary school in Wavre, Walloon Brabant, Belgium. His parents were originally against his ambitions of becoming a calligraphist and insisted on his continual education and enrollment in a university. In 1989, Szpajdel enrolled at the Université catholique de Louvain where he studied biology, agronomy and forestry, graduating in 1996 with a degree in Forestry Engineering.

It was during his first year of university that Szpajdel joined Thierry Prince's fanzine Septicore, as a writer and illustrator. Some of his early illustrations were featured on the Morbid Noise various artists compilation cassette tapes that came with the fanzines. Septicore released six issues between 1989 and 1991, though two had already been published at the time that Szpajdel joined the team. During his time working at Septicore, Szpajdel was often credited under the pseudonyms Necromaniac, and later Volvox. A seventh issue of Septicore was in development for release in 1992 but was abandoned before completion.

Szpajdel moved from Belgium to England in 2002. Since 2006, he has been residing in Stoke Hill, Exeter, Devon, England, United Kingdom. Although he spends over 30 hours a week drawing, he continues to work a day job as a retail assistant for the Co-op Food convenience store chain around Exeter.

Career 
Szpajdel's most prolific logos include ones designed for death metal band Disgrace in 1990, black metal band Emperor in 1992, alternative rock band Foo Fighters in 2015, hip hop artist Rihanna (designed especially for her MTV Video Music Awards appearance and following Anti World Tour) and thrash metal band Metallica, both in 2016. He has also illustrated logos for posters of such films as Mandy and Lords of Chaos (both 2018) and The Tell Tale Heart (2020). Since designing his first professional band logo for Belgian death metal band Morbid Death (featuring members that would later play in Enthroned) in 1988, Szpajdel estimates to have drawn over 10,000 logos, mainly within the black metal, death metal and dark ambient music scenes.

The significant amount of work that Szpajdel has done in the industry has led him to be nicknamed, originally by a fan in 2006, the Lord of the Logos. This sobriquet was reinforced when he authored a book of the same name, Lord of the Logos: Designing the Metal Underground, published in January 2010 through . The book showcases a selection of 2500 of his illustrations from over the years, accompanied by photographs taken by Szpajdel. Lord of the Logos: Designing the Metal Underground was successful enough for a sequel, titled Archaic Modernism: The Art of Christophe Szpajdel, publication through Heavy Music Artwork on 16 December 2020. When first announced in the 2010s, the second book's title was tentatively titled Ancient Modernism; once it was picked up for publishing by Heavy Music Artwork, it was given a release date for September 2020 but was pushed back by several months. Szpajdel's illustrations and interviews have also appeared in the books Logos from Hell: A Compendium of Death and Black Metal Logos (2008, re-printed 2015; Doomentia Press), Black Metal: Beyond the Darkness (2012; Black Dog Publishing), Black Metal: Evolution of the Cult (2013, Feral House), Darkadya: The Book of Art From Below Vol. 2 (2016, Darkadya Books) and Arte Arcana (2018; Heavy Music Artwork), and have been featured in such magazine as Metal Maniacs, Metal Hammer, Terrorizer and Vice.

Szpajdel was also the subject of a documentary, appropriately titled Lord of the Logos, which explores his life and work as cult artist and his decades-long career designing logos for the metal underground. The 12-minute documentary was directed by Luke J. Hagan and had its United Kingdom premiere on 2 December 2016 at the Two Short Nights Film Festival. The documentary had its United States premiere in August 2017 at the San Diego Underground Film Festival, and has most recently been shown again in the United Kingdom at the Homegrown Shorts festival, held at the Curzon Cinema & Arts on 27 March 2019. Szpajdel has also appeared and collaborated with such prominent heavy metal documentaries as Until the Light Takes Us, which was released in 2008 and documents the black metal music scene, and SWR Barroselas Metalfest's The 15th Rebellion of the Steel Warriors, released in 2014.

Style 
Szpajdel has cited Art Deco, Art Nouveau and modernism as major influences in his drawing style. He coined the term depressiv'moderne to categorize his own style. Artists often mentioned as influential include Henri de Toulouse-Lautrec, Victor Horta, Hector Guimard, Peter Behrens, Gustav Klimt, Timothy Pflueger, Wiliam Van Alen, Bruce Goff, Frank Lloyd Wright, Beryl Cook, Tamara de Lempicka.

Works 
This is an incomplete list of logos designed by Szpajdel.

 A Hill to Die Upon
 Abigail Williams
 Absurd
 Abyssal Frost
 Acheron of Sorrow
 Aeternal in Black
 Agnorisis
 Altars
 Anamorph
 The Anchor Aquarium Services
 Ancient Malus
 Anima Damnata
 Animus Mortis
 Apolokia
 Araziel
 Arcturus
 Behexen
 Belle Rouge
 Black Achemoth
 The Black Hand
 Blasphereion
 Blut Aus Nord
 Book of Belial
 Bouq
 Brymir
 Borknagar
 Catharist
 Ceremonium
 Chasma
 Corpus Christii
 Covenant
 Cryostorm
 Cryptic Tales
 Cursed Ruin
 Dark Fortress
 Dark Horizon Productions
 Dark Storm
 Darkside Of Innocence
 Dawn of a Dark Age
 Dawn Of Crucifixion
 Deadwood Lake
 Deathraid
 Deborah Dean
 Desaster
 Dimmu Borgir
 Disciples of the Watch
 Disgrace
 Deviser
 Draconian
 Dragonfly
 Droefheid
 Elysium
 Emperor
 Empyrium
 Enthroned
 Eternity of Darkness
 Ezurate
 Falkenbach
 Fast Company
 Filii Nigrantium Infernalium
 Flagellum Dei
 Fleshgod Apocalypse
 Foo Fighters
 Forever Mourne
 Frog Mallet
 The Golden Age
 Graveland
 The Green Evening Requiem
 Hantaoma
 Heartbleed
 Hell-Militia
 Holocausto Canibal
 Horacle
 Horna
 Idolatry
 Illicit
 Immundus
 Impiety
 In The Wake Of Tragedy
 Ingested
 Ishmael
 Judas Iscariot
 Jpan_arts
 Kult ov Azazel
 Laconist
 Liar Of Golgotha
 Lichway
 Licurgo
 Liquid Angel
 Maid Room
 Malice Divine 
 Meat Anchor
 Melechesh
 Metallica
 Moonspell
 Morbid Death
 Morbid God
 Morgawr
 Mortal Profecia
 Mystifier
 Nachtmystium
 Namter
 Nargaroth
 Necro Ritual
 Night Line
 Ninkharsag
 Nocturn Deambulation
 The Obelisk
 The Obliterate Plague
 Old Man's Child
 Primigenium
 Really Interesting Group
 Rihanna
 Sacramentary Abolishment
 Samsas Traum
 Sceptocrypt
 Seize The Soul
 Seth
 Shoot Me Again
 Slanesh
 Slaughter Messiah
 Soulburn
 Spheres
 Starless Night
 Stone Circle
 Stormcrow
 Trimonium
 Trivium
 Truth Be Told
 Tsjuder
 TV3 News
 UnderConsideration
 Unleash
 Valdyr
 Visalis
 Violent Virtues
 Vision Eternel
 Warcrab
 Witchcraft
 Witchmaster
 With Faith Or Flames
 Wolves in the Throne Room
 The Wounded Kings
 Zoltar

Exhibitions 
Szpajdel's work has been exhibited around the world. The following list provides an (incomplete) overview.

2007 

 29 September: Autumn Equinox Festival, Dingbatz, Clifton, New Jersey, United States

2009 

Art Deco Society Exhibition, Newport, Oregon, United States

2010 

 29 January: Christophe Szpajdel Mini-Exposition, Exeter Central Library, Exeter, Devon, England
 25–30 October: Music and Image Festival, Roodkapje, Rotterdam, The Netherlands

2011 

 6–21 September: Devon Open Studios, North Bridge Inn, Exeter, Devon, England
 11–23 September: Christophe Szpajdel, Magnum Opus Tattoo Gallery, Brighton, England
 November: Little Krimminals, Studio Krimm, Berlin, Germany
 October–February 2012: Graphic Design Now in Production, Walker Arts Center, Minneapolis, Minnesota, United States

2012 

 October 2011-February: Graphic Design Now in Production, Walker Arts Center, Minneapolis, Minnesota, United States
January–March: Black Thorns in the White Cube, Paragraph Gallery, Kansas City, Missouri, United States
 January–March: Western Exhibitions, Chicago, Illinois, United States
May–September: Graphic Design Now in Production, Cooper-Hewitt National Design Museum, New York City, United States
August: Wacken Open Air, Wacken, Germany
 September: Graphic Design Now in Production, Hammer Museum, Los Angeles, California, United States

2013 

 18 February – 1 March: Trerise Gallery, The Hoe, Plymouth, England
16 March – 1 April: Fish Factory Arts Space, Falmouth, England
June: Santa Maria Summer Festival, Casa da Cultura. Beja, Alentejo, Portugal
28 September: Ancient Modernism, Nature: Art + Design, Auckland, New Zealand
1 October: Ancient Modernism, Rogue & Vagabond, Wellington, New Zealand
26 October: Aurora Infernalis Festival, Arnhem, The Netherlands
31 October – 25 December: Macabre Exhibition, The Old Press, St Austell, Cornwall, England

2014 

 13 February – 15 April: Impromptu, Tobacco House, Exeter, Devon, England
22 March – 22 April: Ego Fine Art, Redondo Beach, California, United States
11 April - June: Inspired By Black Metal, Ancienne Belgique, Brussels, Belgium
19 April: Blacken the Globe Festival, Alice Springs, Australia
10 May: Crepusculum Australe Exhibition, Rosemount Hotel, Perth, Australia
6 September: Gohelle Festival, Lille, France
 3–4 October: Vimaranes Metallum Festival, Guimaraes, Portugal
 3–10 October: Murmures D'Outre Tombe, Nerdiest Showroom, Meltdown Comics, Los Angeles, California, United States
18 November – 2 January 2015: Jabberwocky & Extreme Metal Art Exhibition, Exeter Phoenix, Exeter, Devon, England
22 November: Metalwarzone Festival, Airliner, Los Angeles, California, United States

2015 

 2015: Marks of Metal, Odense, Denmark
 2015: Walker's Graphic Design: Now in Production

2016 

 2016: Words and Pictures Exhibition, Torquay's Artizan Gallery, Devon, England

2017 

 17–30 September: A Journey Into The Lost Homelands Exhibition, Kafeneio Eleftheria, Drama, Greece

2018 

 February: The Art Of You, Artizan Gallery, Torquay, England

See also 
 List of Belgians
 List of calligraphers
 List of illustrators

References

Further reading

External links 
 
 
 
 



1970 births
20th-century calligraphers
21st-century calligraphers
Album-cover and concert-poster artists
Belgian artists
Belgian expatriates in England
Belgian illustrators
Belgian people of Polish descent
Black metal
Living people
Logo designers
People from Gembloux
Université catholique de Louvain alumni